Margaret J. Geller (born December 8, 1947) is an American astrophysicist at the Center for Astrophysics  Harvard & Smithsonian. Her work has included pioneering maps of the nearby universe, studies of the relationship between galaxies and their environment, and the development and application of methods for measuring the distribution of matter in the universe.

Career
Geller made pioneering maps of large-scale structure in the universe. Geller received a Bachelor of Arts degree in Physics at the University of California, Berkeley (1970) and a Ph.D. in Physics from Princeton (1974). Geller completed her doctoral dissertation, titled "Bright galaxies in rich clusters: a statistical model for magnitude distributions", under the supervision of James Peebles. Although Geller was thinking about studying solid state physics in graduate school, Charles Kittel suggested she go to Princeton to study astrophysics.

After research fellowships at the Center for Astrophysics  Harvard & Smithsonian and the Institute of Astronomy in Cambridge, England, she became an assistant professor of Astronomy at Harvard University (1980-1983). She then joined the permanent scientific staff of the Smithsonian Astrophysical Observatory, a partner in the Center for Astrophysics  Harvard & Smithsonian.

Geller is a Fellow of the American Association for the Advancement of Science and a Fellow of the American Physical Society. In 1990, she was elected as a Fellow of the American Academy of Arts and Sciences. Two years later, she was elected to the Physics section of the US National Academy of Sciences. From 2000 to 2003, she served on the Council of the National Academy of Sciences. She has received seven honorary degrees (D. S. H. C. or L. H. C.).

Research
Geller is known for observational and theoretical work in cosmology and extragalactic astronomy. Her long range goals are to discover what the universe looks like and to understand how the patterns we observe today evolved. In the 1980s, she made pioneering maps of the nearby universe, which included the Great Wall and was the inspiration for Jasper Johns 2020 piece called Slice. Her SHELS project maps the distribution of dark matter in the universe. With the 6.5-m MMT, she leads a deeper survey of the middle-aged universe called 
HectoMAP. Geller has developed innovative techniques for investigating the structure and mass of clusters of galaxies and the relationship between clusters and their surroundings.

Geller is also a co-discoverer of hypervelocity stars which may be an important tracer of the matter distribution in the Galaxy.

Films and Public Lectures
Geller has made several films for public education. Her 8-minute video Where the Galaxies Are (1989) was the first graphic voyage through the observed universe and was awarded a CINE Gold Eagle. A later 40-minute film, So Many Galaxies...So Little Time, contains more sophisticated prize-winning (IEEE/Siggraph) graphics and was on display at the National Air and Space Museum.

Geller has lectured extensively to public audiences around the world. She has lectured twice in
the main amphitheater at the Chautauqua Institution.

She is included in NPR's list of The Best Commencement Speeches, Ever.

Her story about her entry into astrophysics and meeting the renowned astrophysicist John Archibald Wheeler, entitled "Mapping the Universe" was published by The Story Collider podcast on May 21, 2014.

Books
Geller's work is discussed in Physics in the Twentieth Century. Popular articles by Geller appear with those by Robert Woodrow Wilson, David Todd Wilkinson, J. Anthony Tyson and Vera Rubin in Beyond Earth: Mapping the Universe and with others by Alan Lightman, Robert Kirshner, Vera Rubin, Alan Guth, and James E. Gunn in Bubbles, Voids and Bumps in Time: The New Cosmology.

Awards and honors
1989 Newcomb Cleveland Prize of the American Association for the Advancement of Science along with John P. Huchra for "Mapping the Universe" 
1990 MacArthur Foundation Fellowship
1990 American Academy of Arts and Science
1992 National Academy of Sciences
1993 Helen Sawyer Hogg Lecture of the Canadian Astronomical Society
1996 Klopsteg Memorial Award of the American Association of Physics Teachers
1997 New York Public Library Library Lion 
2003 La Medaille de l'ADION of Nice Observatory
2008 Magellanic Premium by the American Philosophical Society for her research into the groupings of galaxies.
2009 Honorary Degree (D.S.H.C.) from Colby College
2010 Henry Norris Russell Lectureship of the American Astronomical Society
2010 James Craig Watson Medal of the National Academy of Sciences
2013 Julius Edgar Lilienfeld Prize of the American Physical Society
2014 Karl Schwarzschild Medal of the German Astronomical Society
2014 Honorary Degree (D.S.H.C.) from Dartmouth College
2017 Honorary Degree (L.H.C.) from University of Turin

References

Further reading

External links
Margaret Geller's homepage at the Smithsonian Astrophysical Observatory
 at the Accademia delle Scienzia di Torino, April 2017
 at the University of Turin, April 2017

 at the 2013 meeting of the American Physical Society 
 at Chautauqua

Caught in the Cosmic Web
Research Features  Interview

Living people
1947 births
Discoverers of astronomical objects
Fellows of the American Academy of Arts and Sciences
Harvard University faculty
MacArthur Fellows
Academics of the University of Cambridge
Scientists from Ithaca, New York
Princeton University alumni
Smithsonian Institution people
University of California, Berkeley alumni
American women astronomers
Members of the United States National Academy of Sciences
Fellows of the American Physical Society
Fellows of the American Association for the Advancement of Science
Harvard–Smithsonian Center for Astrophysics people